The black-fronted tern (Chlidonias albostriatus), also known as sea martin, ploughboy, inland tern, riverbed tern or tarapiroe, is a small tern generally found in or near bodies of fresh water in New Zealand, where it forages for freshwater fish, arthropods and worms. It has a predominantly grey plumage. Restricted to breeding in the eastern regions of the South Island, it is declining and threatened by introduced mammals and birds.  It is rated as endangered on the International Union for Conservation of Nature (IUCN)'s Red List of Threatened Species.

Taxonomy
German naturalist Johann Reinhold Forster described the black-fronted tern from a specimen collected at Queen Charlotte Sound, Marlborough in 1832, giving it the binomial name Sterna antarctica, however the name had already been used for the Antarctic tern by French naturalist René Lesson the previous year.

The first valid description of the species was by George Robert Gray in 1845, who called it Hydrochelidon albostriata. Its specific name is derived from the Latin albus "white", and striatus "striped". Charles Lucien Bonaparte spelled its species name albistriata in 1856, which was adopted by subsequent authors until it was corrected by Walter Oliver in 1955.

Its taxonomic placement was unclear for many years, as its plumage and migration inland to nest suggested it belonged with the marsh terns of the genus Chlidonias yet it did not nest in marshes like the other members of that genus. Martin Moynihan described it as "the most puzzling case", ultimately placing it in Sterna as he suspected the similarity of its breeding plumage to that of C. hybrida was due to similarity in environment and observed that the nonbreeding plumage resembled that of other members of Sterna. Gochfeld and Berger (1996) followed in keeping it in Sterna, while Charles Sibley and Burt Monroe placed it in Chlidonias. A 2005 molecular study by Bridge and colleagues placed it as a basal member of the marsh terns, settling the issue.

The species has several vernacular names. Gray noted in 1845 that the Maori called it tarapiroe. It is called ploughboy or ploughman's friend for its habit of foraging for earthworms and grubs in newly ploughed soil.

Description
Measuring 29 cm (12 in) in length, the adult tern has predominantly grey plumage with a black cap typical of many terns. The underparts and rump are white, and there is a thin white streak running along the cheeks underneath the cap. The bill is red and legs orange. The black cap recedes from the bill in non-breeding plumage and becomes flecked with white.

Distribution and habitat
Within New Zealand, the black-fronted tern is found from the southern tip of the North Island, and along much of the eastern South Island from Marlborough to Southland, and to Stewart Island. There is an outlying population along the Buller and upper Motueka Rivers in southern Nelson.

Breeding
The breeding range is restricted to South Island only. It lives along riverbanks and can forage out to 10 km (6 mi) at sea in the nonbreeding season.

Fieldwork on the Wairau River in Marlbrorough showed that the swamp harrier (Circus approximans) is a common raider of black-fronted tern nests for eggs, with the native kelp gull (Larus dominicanus) and South Island oystercatchers (Haematopus finschi) also raiding. Introduced mammals such as the cat (Felis catus), stoat (Mustela erminea), hedgehog (Erinaceus europaeus occidentalis) and black rat (Rattus rattus) have also been recorded.

Conservation
Numbers of black-fronted terns are decreasing across its range, and the species is classified as endangered. Threats include several species introduced to New Zealand - stoats (Mustela spp.), feral cats, the brown rat (Rattus norvegicus), hedgehog, dog, and from Australia, the common brushtail possum (Trichosurus vulpecula), and Australian magpie (Gymnorhina tibicen).

Gallery

References

black-fronted tern
Birds of the South Island
black-fronted tern
black-fronted tern
Endemic birds of New Zealand